The Rayleigh Town Museum is a small local museum on the top floor at 91 High Street, Rayleigh. It is run by a registered charity. The building is a Grade II listed building which is a former timber-framed house dating from at least the 16th century.
The museum received funding of £89,800 in March 2015 from the Heritage Lottery Fund for its "inception, development and sustainability." It was officially opened by the local MP, Mark Francois, on 9 April 2016.

References 

Museums in Essex
Local museums